George Seitz may refer to:

 George Seitz (politician) (1941–2015), Labor member of the Legislative Assembly in Victoria, Australia
 George A. Seitz (1897–1947), officer in the United States Navy
 George B. Seitz (1888–1944), American playwright, screenwriter, film actor and director
 George Seitz (c. 1895–1976), American cold-case murder victim